Karwowski (feminine: Karwowska, plural: Karwowscy) is a Polish surname. The surname is associated with any of places called Karwowo. It has ancient roots in the royal families of Poland. Notable people with the surname include:

Antoni Karwowski, Polish artist
Kazimierz Karwowski, Polish nobleman and politician
Krystyna Karwowska (1931–2018), Polish professor of agricultural science
Krzysztof Karwowski (born 1963), Polish diplomat
Łukasz Karwowski, Polish film director

Polish-language surnames
Polish toponymic surnames